"Warrior" is a hip hop song performed by rapper Nelly. It was released on July 29, 2008 promotionally for the 2008 Summer Olympics. 
The song appears on the AT&T TEAM USA Soundtrack as well as on the iTunes Store edition of Nelly'''s fourth studio album, Brass Knuckles''.

The video of the song was released on August 18, 2008, and features scenes of American Olympians intercut with scenes of Nelly recording the song.

This song is also the theme song of George Balhan's Mohawk Warrior Monster Truck that is held in Monster Jam events until his retirement in 2016.

Charts

2008 singles
2008 songs
Nelly songs
Universal Motown Records singles
Songs written by Nelly
Songs written by Theron Feemster